Kruševica (Serbian Cyrillic: Крушевица) is a mountain in southern Serbia, near the town of Vlasotince. Its highest peak, Vita kruška, has an elevation of  913 meters above sea level.

References

Mountains of Serbia